Tom Proctor is an American actor.

Proctor is best known for such films and television series as Lawless, Justified, the role of Biddee in 12 Years a Slave, Django Unchained, Looper, Touched by an Angel and the role of Horuz in Guardians of the Galaxy. In June 2018, Tom Proctor released his debut country album entitled "Working Man" by his band Tom Proctor and the A-Listers.

Selected filmography

Windrunner (1994) as Convict #1
Halloween: The Curse of Michael Myers (1995) as Motorist
Breaking Free (1995) as First Rancher
Unhook the Stars (1996) as Duncan
Coyote Summer (1996) as Little Max
They Know (2006) as The killer
Skeletons in the Desert (2008) as Captain McNamara
Pandemic (2009) as Clay
Bounty (2009) as Carl 'Grunt' Henderson
The Black Waters of Echo's Pond (2009) as Thomas
The Road to Freedom (2010) as Francias
Texas Killing Fields (2011) as Poacher 2
Bending the Rules (2012) as Thug #4
The Courier (2012) as Torture Man
Lawless (2012) as Hophead #2
The Baytown Outlaws (2012) as Downstairs Thug
Heathens and Thieves (2012) as Sheriff Ashplant
Django Unchained (2012) as Candyland Cowboy (uncredited)
Knife to a Gunfight (2013) as Don
12 Years a Slave (2013) as Biddee
Guardians of the Galaxy (2014) as Horuz, Ravager
The Birth of a Nation (2016) as E.T. Brantley
Blood Sombrero (2016) as Coffin
Off Sides 2016 (2016) as Menace
Wilson (2017) as Silverwolf
Alicia's Dream (2017) as Gregory
Heart, Baby (2017) as Lucky
Finding Eden (2017) as Donner
My BFF Satan (2018) as Satan
Benji (2018) as Cajun Captain
The Ballad of Buster Scruggs (2018) as Cantina Bad Man (segment "The Ballad of Buster Scruggs")
Beneath the Leaves (2019) as Behemoth
Nation's Fire (2019) as Owen
The Legend of 5 Mile Cave (2019) as Virgil Earp
47 Hours (2019) as Hilbilly
The Devil Below (2021) as Kip

Awards
 2014 Northeast Film Festival
 Best Actor in a Short Film - Sins (2013)

References

External links

21st-century American male actors
American male film actors
American male television actors
American stunt performers
Living people
Year of birth missing (living people)
Place of birth missing (living people)
Scottsdale Community College alumni